Montgomery County Courthouse is a historic courthouse in Courthouse Square in Mount Vernon, Georgia, the county seat of Montgomery County, Georgia. It was built in 1907 and renovated in 1991–92. It was added to the National Register of Historic Places on September 18, 1980.

It is the third courthouse built in Mount Vernon for Montgomery County, which was formed in 1793. It is a two-story courthouse made of cream and red brick and granite and limestone trim. It has a Doric tetrastyle portico at its main entrance, flanked by projecting pavilions with cream brick quoins. An octagonal dome rises from the center of the structure and features hooded clocks facing in four directions.

The interior of the courthouse, as of 1980, had its original balcony, benches, and mantels. Corinthian pilasters with gold-painted capitals alternated with windows, and beaded board wainscoting went around the room. The ceiling is of pressed metal divided into nine recessed squares.

According to its historic register nomination, "This is the finest building, architecturally, in the entire Mount Vernon area."

The original clockworks are on display inside the courthouse. The original features discussed in the 1980 NRHP nomination form are still there as of 2017.

Photos

See also
 National Register of Historic Places listings in Montgomery County, Georgia

References

External links
 

County courthouses in Georgia (U.S. state)
Courthouses on the National Register of Historic Places in Georgia (U.S. state)
Buildings and structures in Montgomery County, Georgia
National Register of Historic Places in Montgomery County, Georgia
1907 establishments in Georgia (U.S. state)
Government buildings completed in 1907